Sonorella is a genus of land snails in the subfamily Helminthoglyptinae. They are known commonly as talussnails or talus snails because most live in talus and similar habitat. They are distributed across the southwestern United States and adjacent Mexico. There are about 80 species.

Species 
Species include:
Sonorella allynsmithi – Phoenix talussnail   
Sonorella ambigua – Papago talussnail   
Sonorella anchana – Sierra Ancha talussnail, wreathed cactussnail   
Sonorella animasensis – Animas talussnail, bicolored cactussnail   
Sonorella apache – Apache talussnail   
Sonorella ashmuni – Richinbar talussnail   
Sonorella baboquivariensis – Baboquivari talussnail   
Sonorella bagnarai – Rincon talussnail   
Sonorella bartschi – Escabrosa talussnail   
Sonorella bequaerti – Happy Valley talussnail   
Sonorella bicipitis – Dos Cabezas talussnail   
Sonorella binneyi – Horseshoe Canyon talussnail   
Sonorella bowiensis – Quartzite Hill talussnail   
Sonorella bradshaveana – Bradshaw talussnail   
Sonorella caerulifluminis – blue talussnail   
Sonorella christenseni – Clark Peak talussnail   
Sonorella clappi – Madera talussnail   
Sonorella coloradoensis – Grand Canyon talussnail   
Sonorella coltoniana – Walnut Canyon talussnail   
Sonorella compar – Oak Creek talussnail   
Sonorella dalli – Garden Canyon talussnail   
Sonorella danielsi – Bear Canyon talussnail   
Sonorella delicata – Tollhouse Canyon talussnail   
Sonorella dragoonensis – Stronghold Canyon talussnail   
Sonorella eremita – San Xavier talussnail   
Sonorella ferrissi – Dragoon talussnail   
Sonorella franciscana – St. Francis talussnail   
Sonorella galiurensis – Galiuro talussnail   
Sonorella grahamensis – Pinaleno talussnail   
Sonorella granulatissima – Ramsey Canyon talussnail   
Sonorella hachitana – New Mexico talussnail (the type species)
Sonorella huachucana – Huachuca talussnail   
Sonorella imitator – mimic talussnail   
Sonorella imperatrix – Total Wreck talussnail   
Sonorella imperialis – Empire Mountain talussnail   
Sonorella insignis – Whetstone talussnail   
Sonorella macrophallus – Wet Canyon talussnail   
Sonorella magdalenensis – Sonoran talussnail   
Sonorella meadi – Agua Dulce talussnail   
Sonorella metcalfi – Franklin Mountain talussnail   
Sonorella micra – pygmy talussnail   
Sonorella micromphala – Milk Ranch talussnail   
Sonorella milleri – Table Top talussnail   
Sonorella mustang – Mustang talussnail   
Sonorella neglecta – Portal talussnail   
Sonorella odorata – pungent talussnail   
Sonorella optata – Big Emigrant talussnail   
Sonorella orientis – Organ Mountain talussnail   
Sonorella papagorum – Black Mountain talussnail   
Sonorella parva – little talussnail   
Sonorella reederi – rampart talussnail   
Sonorella rinconensis – Posta Quemada talussnail   
Sonorella rooseveltiana – Roosevelt talussnail   
Sonorella russelli – Black Mesa talussnail   
Sonorella sabinoensis – Santa Catalina talussnail   
Sonorella santaritana – Agua Caliente talussnail   
Sonorella simmonsi – Picacho talussnail   
Sonorella sitiens – Las Guijas talussnail   
Sonorella superstitionis – Superstition Mountain talussnail   
Sonorella todseni – Doña Ana talussnail   
Sonorella tortillita – Tortolita talussnail   
Sonorella tryoniana – Sanford talussnail   
Sonorella vespertina – evening talussnail   
Sonorella virilis – Chiricahua talussnail   
Sonorella walkeri – Santa Rita talussnail   
Sonorella waltoni – Doubtful Canyon talussnail   
Sonorella xanthenes – Kitt Peak talussnail

References

Further reading 
 Pilsbry H. A. (1948). "Inland Mollusks of Northern Mexico. I. The genera Humboldtiana, Sonorella, Oreohelix and Ashmunella". Proceedings of the Academy of Natural Sciences of Philadelphia 100: 185–203.

 
Taxonomy articles created by Polbot